The Arab Contractors, also known as Al Mokawloon Al Arab, is an Egyptian regional construction and contracting company.

History
It was established in 1955 by Osman Ahmed Osman, an Egyptian entrepreneur and politician who served as Egypt's Housing Minister under Sadat's presidency. It was nationalized in 1961 following the Egyptian revolution of 1952. It has been involved in the construction of several government buildings in Egypt. The company also owns a football club, El Mokawloon SC, that plays in the Egyptian Premier League.

Since the late 1970s, the company has diversified its business to include banking, insurance, agriculture, food processing, hotel services and health care. Today, El-Mokawloon El-Arab is one of the largest companies in the  Middle East and North Africa with projects not only in Egypt, but also Morocco, UAE, Algeria, Libya, Uganda, Lebanon, Kuwait.

Infrastructure projects
Aswan High Dam
Bibliotheca Alexandrina
Cairo-Alexandria desert road
Luxor International Airport
Sharm El Sheikh International Airport
Hurghada International Airport
Nador International Airport - Morocco
Borg El Arab Stadium
Yasser Arafat International Airport - Gaza Strip
Julius Nyerere Hydropower Station
6th October Bridge
Nador International Airport
Smart Village, Egypt
Rod El Farag Axis Bridge

External links
Official website

References

Construction and civil engineering companies of Egypt
Construction and civil engineering companies established in 1955
Government-owned companies of Egypt
Egyptian companies established in 1955